Mama Rose (subtitled Live in Concert) is a live album by saxophonist Archie Shepp and pianist Jasper van 't Hof featuring a performance recorded in 1982 to celebrate the 20th anniversary of the Jazz Club Villingen and released on the Danish SteepleChase label.

Track listing
All compositions by Jasper van 't Hof except where noted.
 "Contracts" – 9:17 	
 "Mama Rose" (Archie Shepp) – 12:03
 "People" – 11:47
 "Kalimba" – 3:39
 "Recovered Residence" – 5:19

Personnel
 Archie Shepp – tenor saxophone, soprano saxophone, recitation
 Jasper van 't Hof – piano, electric piano, organ, synthesizer, computer, kalimba

References

1982 live albums
Archie Shepp live albums
Jasper van 't Hof albums
SteepleChase Records live albums